Bilecik is an electoral district of the Grand National Assembly of Turkey. It elects two members of parliament (deputies) to represent the province of the same name for a four-year term by the D'Hondt method, a party-list proportional representation system.

Members 
Population reviews of each electoral district are conducted before each general election, which can lead to certain districts being granted a smaller or greater number of parliamentary seats. As one of the smallest electoral districts, Bilecik has consistently elected two MPs since 1999.

General elections

2011

June 2015

November 2015

2018

Presidential elections

2014

References 

Electoral districts of Turkey
Politics of Bilecik Province